St. Gregory's Abbey may refer to:

St. Gregory's Abbey (Oklahoma) in Shawnee, Oklahoma
St. Gregory's Abbey, Three Rivers in Michigan